The Escuela Superior de Guerra (founded 1909) is a military college under the Military Forces of Colombia. It was founded during the reforms of President Rafael Reyes, himself a former general. Alumni include President Gabriel París Gordillo.

References

Military of Colombia
Education in Bogotá
Military schools